Hartmut Huhse (born 22 August 1952) is a retired German footballer who played as a defender. He played in the Bundesliga for Schalke 04 and Rot-Weiss Essen. In 1972, he won the DFB-Pokal with Schalke.

References

External links 
 

1952 births
Living people
German footballers
Association football defenders
Bundesliga players
2. Bundesliga players
North American Soccer League (1968–1984) players
FC Schalke 04 players
Rot-Weiss Essen players
Rochester Lancers (1967–1980) players
FC Fribourg players
People from Greifswald
Footballers from Mecklenburg-Western Pomerania